Kotaro Mizumachi (水町孝太郎, Mizumachi Kōtarō; born 13 March 1995) is a Japanese handball player. He competed in the 2020 Summer Olympics.

References

1995 births
Living people
Handball players at the 2020 Summer Olympics
Japanese male handball players
Olympic handball players of Japan